is an underground metro station on the Sendai Subway Nanboku Line in Aoba-ku, Sendai, Miyagi Prefecture, Japan.

Lines

Station layout
Itsutsubashi Station is an underground station with a single island platform serving two tracks.

Platforms

History
Itsutsubashi Station opened on 15 July 1987.

Passenger statistics
In fiscal 2015, the station was used by an average of 5,857 passengers daily.

Surrounding area
 Sendai Municipal Hospital
 Tohoku Gakuin University Tsuchitoi Campus
 Sendai Itsutsubashi Junior High School
 Sendai Seiyo Gakuin Junior College
 Iris Ohyama Head Office
 Sumitomo Life Sendaichūō Building

References

External links

 

Railway stations in Miyagi Prefecture
Sendai Subway Namboku Line
Railway stations in Japan opened in 1987